The King’s Disguise, and Friendship with Robin Hood is Child ballad 151.  It holds the common tradition of the end of Robin Hood's outlawry, although it is a relatively late ballad, as it puts Robin firmly in King Richard's reign.  Also, unlike "A Gest of Robyn Hode", an earlier version, the king is not acting out of the need to suppress Robin.

Synopsis
King Richard decides he must see Robin Hood and disguises himself as an abbot and his men as monks.  Robin finds them and disbelieves him when he says they are royal messengers, but affirming he has done no harm to the innocent, brings them to an entertainment.  They feed them and have an archery contest.  The King asks if Robin could receive a pardon, would he serve the King?  Robin says he would.  The King reveals himself, they go to Nottingham to eat with the sheriff, and Robin goes to court to serve the King.

Adaptations
Many movie versions of the Robin Hood story conclude with the appearance of King Richard in disguise, returning from the Crusades.

This ballad was adapted into the final episode of Season One of Robin of Sherwood. However, in this version, Little John realizes that the King has little interest in Robin's advice and is treating him as a court jester. Robin is initially disbelieving, but when he speaks out against the King's plans to raise taxes for his war against Philip II of France, Richard decides he has gone too far, and he must escape from the King's assassins, back to Sherwood Forest.

Notes

External links
The King’s Disguise, and Friendship with Robin Hood

Child Ballads
Robin Hood ballads
Year of song unknown